Eugene German (born December 2, 1997) is an American professional basketball player for Qingdao Eagles of the Chinese Basketball Association (CBA). He played college basketball for the Northern Illinois Huskies and left as the program's all-time leading scorer and a conference champion.

High school career
German grew up in crime-ridden Gary, Indiana and played basketball from an early age under his father's guidance. At age 10, he was noticed by an Amateur Athletic Union coach at a church camp tournament and began playing around the state and country. German started high school at Andrean High School in Merrillville, Indiana but moved to Theodore Roosevelt High School in Gary, Indiana before playing a basketball game for Andrean. He did not play for Roosevelt either due to a left hip fracture.

For his sophomore season, German transferred to 21st Century Charter School in Gary, averaging 17.4 points per game. As a junior, he averaged a state-high 32 points, six rebounds, three assists and three steals per game and was named to the Small School All-State team. After the season, he committed to play college basketball for Northern Illinois. As a senior, German averaged 33.5 points, 5.6 rebounds and four assists per game, helping 21st Century win a regional title. He had nine 40-point games and scored 51 points in a loss to national powerhouse La Lumiere School. He led the state of Indiana in scoring for a second straight year, becoming the first player to do so since Deshaun Thomas in 2009 and 2010. German earned Post-Tribune Player of the Year and Small School All-State honors. German finished his high school career as 21st Century's all-time leading scorer with 2,020 points.

College career
On February 18, 2017, German scored a freshman season-high 27 points in an 88–80 overtime loss to Toledo. As a freshman, he averaged nine points per game and was named to the Mid-American Conference (MAC) All-Freshman Team. German gained about 15 pounds after his freshman season and had breakout success as a sophomore. On February 17, 2018, he scored a season-high 31 points in a 75–67 win over Western Michigan. In his sophomore season, German led the MAC with 20.6 points per game while averaging 3.8 rebounds and 1.7 assists and was named to the second team All-MAC.

On November 28, as a junior, he recorded a career-high 33 points and five rebounds in an 85–83 loss to Green Bay. German averaged 20.4 points, 5.2 rebounds and 2.9 assists per game to earn second-team All-MAC honors. He was also named to the MAC All-Tournament Team after averaging 27 points per game at the 2019 MAC tournament. Against Miami (Ohio) on February 1, 2020, as a senior, German passed T. J. Lux as Northern Illinois' all-time leading scorer and became the first player in program history to score 2,000 career points. In his senior season, he averaged a MAC-leading 20.5 points, 4.1 rebounds and 2.7 assists per game. German was named to the Lou Henson All-America Team by Collegeinsider.com and to the first team All-MAC. He finished his career at Northern Illinois with 2,203 points, which ranked fifth in MAC history.

Professional career
In March 2021, German signed with the Kokomo BobKats of The Basketball League.

On August 9, 2021, German signed with Greek club Ionikos Nikaias. He averaged 20 points, 2.8 rebounds, and 2.3 assists per game.

On February 10, 2022, German signed with Merkezefendi Belediyesi Denizli Basket of the Basketbol Süper Ligi.

On May 25, 2022, he has signed with Qingdao Eagles of the Chinese Basketball Association.

Personal life
German's father, David German Sr., played basketball for Horace Mann School in the 1980s. His mother, Eugenia, ran track for Mann. German's sister, Princess, played college basketball for Milwaukee and Indianapolis. His brother, David Jr., played basketball for 21st Century Charter School.

References

External links
Northern Illinois Huskies bio

1997 births
Living people
American men's basketball players
American expatriate basketball people in Greece
Basketball players from Gary, Indiana
Ionikos Nikaias B.C. players
Merkezefendi Belediyesi Denizli Basket players
Northern Illinois Huskies men's basketball players
Point guards